Eleven Eleven is the eleventh studio album by folk rock musician Dave Alvin. It was released on June 20, 2011 on Yep Roc Records, and an expanded reissue was released on April 17, 2012.

Recording
The recording of Eleven Eleven was influenced by the then-recent deaths of Alvin's friends Chris Gaffney and Amy Farris. The eleven songs on Eleven Eleven were written over the course of seven months, with three exceptions: the three duets on the album, which were "What's Up With Your Brother", "Manzanita", and "Two Lucky Bums". "What's Up With Your Brother" is a duet between Alvin and his brother, Phil Alvin, in which both brothers sing together for the first time on record. "Manzanita" is a duet between Alvin and Christy McWilson, a member of his band, the Guilty Women. "Two Lucky Bums" is a duet between Alvin and Chris Gaffney, and represents Gaffney's last recording before he died in 2008. The song "Harlan County Line" was written for the TV show Justified.

Critical reception

Eleven Eleven received mostly favorable reviews from critics. Wayne Robins wrote in American Songwriter that the album's best songs were "character studies or snapshots of history". Many critics described "Johnny Ace is Dead" as one of the best songs on the album, with Steve Horowitz of PopMatters calling it "the best damn Johnny Ace song one could ever imagine."

Track listing
All tracks composed by Dave Alvin; except where indicated
"Harlan County Line" – 5:12
"Johnny Ace is Dead" – 4:27
"Black Rose of Texas" – 4:52
"Gary, Indiana 1959" – 4:06
"Run Conejo Run" – 4:52
"No Worries Mija" (Chris Gaffney) – 3:36
"What's Up with Your Brother?" – 4:44
"Murrietta's Head" – 5:59
"Manzanita" (Christy McWilson) – 4:09
"Dirty Nightgown" – 5:19
"Two Lucky Bums" – 2:28

Bonus tracks on 2012 reissue
"Never Trust a Woman"
"Signal Hill"
"Beautiful City 'Cross the River"

Personnel
Dave Alvin – vocals, guitar
Phil Alvin – vocals
Gregory Boaz – bass
Chris Gaffney – accordion, vocals
Bob Glaub – bass, percussion
Don Heffington – drums, percussion, timbales
David Jackson – accordion, upright bass
Greg Leisz – baritone guitar, guitar, lap steel guitar
Christy McWilson – piano, vocals
Steve Mugalian – drums, percussion
Danny Ott – slide guitar, guitar, vocal harmony
Wyman Reese – organ, piano
Jack Rudy – harmonica
Rick Shea – guitar, pedal steel guitar
Gene Taylor – piano

Production notes
Dave Alvin – producer
Craig Parker Adams – engineer, mixing
Joe Gastwirt – mastering
Michael Triplett – art direction, design
Harry Sabin – photo assistance
Nancy Sefton – art direction
Beth Herzhaft – photography

References

2011 albums
Yep Roc Records albums
Dave Alvin albums